Karen Frances Wishner is an American oceanographer currently at University of Rhode Island and an elected fellow of the American Association for the Advancement of Science. Her interests include coastal shelf and zooplankton behavior and environment, and has published her findings.

Education and career 
Wishner has a bachelor of arts degree in biology from the University of Chicago and as a sophomore participated in a field project in Costa Rica which sparked her interest in marine science. Wishner earned her Ph.D. in oceanography from the University of California, San Diego and Scripps Institution of Oceanography where she worked on the ecology of deep-sea plankton. During her dissertation research she collected plankton using nets attached to Deep Tow, the camera system designed by Fred Spiess. Wishner spent one term teaching at the University of California, Santa Cruz after an invitation to do so from Mary Wilcox Silver, and then moved to the University of Rhode Island in 1980 where she was the first female tenure-track faculty hired by the Graduate School of Oceanography. She was promoted to professor in 1993. Wishner's teaching portfolio included a class that investigates right whales and what they eat, with an opportunity for field research conducted from the University of Rhode Island's research ship, the R/V Endeavor. As of 2021, Wishner is emerita professor of oceanography at the University of Rhode Island.

Research 
Wishner is known for her research on zooplankton ecology and behavior, with a focus on copepods. Her early research was on the organisms found in the deep ocean and the rate they were able to consume other organisms. She investigates regions of the ocean with low levels of oxygen and the implications for marine zooplankton and marine food webs. One item of particular interest to Wishner is the copepods found in the oxygen minimum zone in the Arabian Sea. Wishner has also examined the shrimp found in the vicinity of hydrothermal fluids near the Kick 'em Jenny volcano  and plankton in the Eastern Tropical North Pacific.

Selected publications

Awards and honors 
Wishner was elected a fellow of the American Association for the Advancement of Science in 1995.

References

Year of birth missing (living people)
Living people
Fellows of the American Association for the Advancement of Science
University of Rhode Island faculty
American oceanographers
Women oceanographers

University of California, San Diego alumni
University of Chicago alumni
Women marine biologists